Paul "Ando" Anderson (born 2 April 1977) is an English former professional rugby league footballer who played in the 1990s and 2000s.

Playing career

St Helens
Anderson began his playing career in 1995 with St. Helens, and played 46 games for the club. He made his Debut on Boxing Day 1995 in a game against Wigan Warriors at Central Park. Anderson wore #11 playing in the second row in a tough loss to their Super League rivals

Sheffield Eagles
In January 1999, he was signed by Sheffield Eagles for a fee of £10,000.

Leigh
Anderson joined Leigh Centurions later that year, where we went on make over 100 appearances, and also played for Oldham and Rochdale Hornets.

References

1977 births
Living people
English rugby league players
Leigh Leopards coaches
Leigh Leopards players
Oldham R.L.F.C. players
Rochdale Hornets players
Rugby league centres
Rugby league locks
Rugby league players from Leigh, Greater Manchester
Rugby league second-rows
Sheffield Eagles players
St Helens R.F.C. players